The Sukhumi massacre took place on September 27, 1993, during and after the fall of Sukhumi into separatist hands in the course of the War in Abkhazia. It was perpetrated against Georgian civilians of Sukhumi, mainly by militia forces of Abkhaz separatists and North Caucasian allies. It became part of a violent ethnic cleansing campaign carried out by the separatists.

Events 
On September 27, 1993, separatist forces violated the ceasefire initiated by the United Nations and guaranteed by the Russian Federation, which barred both sides from performing military operations.  As part of the ceasefire, Georgian forces had withdrawn their heavy artillery and tanks from Sukhumi.  Abkhaz, Confederation of Mountain Peoples of the Caucasus and Cossack militants stormed Sukhumi early in the morning. Confronted by large numbers of combatants, the Georgian army units that remained in the city were unable to prevent the separatist advance into the city. By noon, separatist militants and their allies had taken over television buildings and bridges. Georgian forces retreated to the Government building of the Abkhazian Autonomous Republic, where they intended to provide security for members of Abkhazian Autonomous Republic Government. By late afternoon, the city was overrun by separatists and their allies.

Placing their hopes on the ceasefire, a large number of civilians remained in the city. The  separatists and their allies started to sweep through the streets of Sukhumi rounding up all civilians that they found. Men, women and children were executed in the streets, on the roads and inside their own apartments, houses and back yards. According to the witnesses, many people became objects of torture, and some were forced to watch as their own family members were killed—children in front of their parents, and parents in front of their children.

The massacres occurred in the city park, in front of the governmental building, in schools and hospitals. Almost all members of the Abkhaz government (those who refused to leave the city) — Zhiuli Shartava, Guram Gabiskiria, Alexander Berulava, Mamia Alasania, and Raul Eshba — were captured and executed.

The 1994 U.S. State Department Country Reports also describes scenes of massive human rights abuse:

Aftermath
Eduard Shevardnadze fled the city only just before the arrival of separatist forces, having earlier committed to try to remain there as long as possible. Soon the forces overran the whole territory of Abkhazia, except a small region of the Kodori Gorge (which remained under the control of the Georgian warlord Emzar Kvitsiani until July 2006 and later the Tbilisi government until August 2008). The total defeat of the Georgian government forces was followed by the ethnic cleansing of the Georgian population. 200,000 - 250,000 refugees (mainly Georgians) were forced out of Abkhazia. Violence continued in 1994 despite an agreement between the Georgian and Abkhazian governments for the deployment of a peacekeeping force from the Commonwealth of Independent States. Chechen militants who had fought on the side of Abkhazia later took part in the First Chechen War.

Perpetrators
There are a number of conflicting claims as to whether the massacre was conducted by Abkhaz militias or those of their North Caucasian allies.  Allegedly, the commander of the separatist forces, partly responsible for the massacre was the deputy defence minister and "hero" of Abkhazia Shamil Basaev. According to witness testimonies, the militants spoke North Caucasian languages and Russian.
However, some refugees who survived the massacre have claimed that they recognized their Abkhaz and Armenian neighbours collaborating with the militants during the massacres in various neighbourhoods.  Many people recall the commands given by Russian officers: "Do not take prisoners alive!"

See also
 Ethnic cleansing of Georgians in Abkhazia
 Georgian-Abkhaz conflict
 Abkhazia
 United Nations resolutions on Abkhazia

Notes

Bibliography
 Chervonnaia, Svetlana Mikhailovna. Conflict in the Caucasus: Georgia, Abkhazia, and the Russian Shadow. Gothic Image Publications, 1994.
 Human Rights Watch. "Georgia/Abkhazia: Violations of the Laws of War and Russia's Role in the Conflict". Published on hrw.org, March 1995.
 Lynch, Dov.  The Conflict in Abkhazia: Dilemmas in Russian 'Peacekeeping' Policy. Royal Institute of International Affairs, February 1998.
 Marshania L. Tragedy of Abkhazia Moscow, 1996
 White Book of Abkhazia. 1992-1993 Documents, Materials, Evidences. Moscow, 1993.
 Derluguian, Georgi M., The Tale of Two Resorts: Abkhazia and Ajaria Before and Since the Soviet Collapse, in Beverly Crawford and Ronnie D Lipschutz (eds.), "The Myth of 'Ethnic Conflict': Politics, Economics, and Cultural Violence" (Berkeley: University of California, 1998). p. 263

External links
 Violations of the laws of war and Russia's role in the conflict report by Human Rights Watch
 Documented accounts of ethnic cleansing of Georgians in Abkhazia (Russian)
 Video file, capture of Zhuili Shartava, Guram Gabiskiria, Raul Eshba, etc and their execution (right-click to open file)
 Video file, ethnic cleansing of Georgians in Abkhazia (right-click to open file)
 Sukhumi 27.09.93 (Video) (wmv)

Mass murder in 1993
Abkhaz–Georgian conflict
War crimes in Georgia (country)
Massacres in Georgia (country)
Ethnic cleansing of Georgians in Abkhazia
1993 in Georgia (country)
1993 crimes in Georgia (country)
Georgia
1990s murders in Georgia (country)
1993 in Abkhazia
Sukhumi
Anti-Georgian sentiment
September 1993 events in Asia